Malte Herwig (born 2 October 1972) is a German-born author, journalist, and literary critic. His articles have appeared widely in U.S., British and German publications, including The New York Times, The Observer, Vanity Fair, Der Spiegel, Die Zeit, Süddeutsche Zeitung and Frankfurter Allgemeine Zeitung. He studied German Literature, History and Politics at the universities of Oxford, Harvard, and Mainz, and is a former Fellow of Merton College, Oxford. In 2008, Herwig was the first to publish some of Vladimir Nabokov's original index cards from the author's last unfinished novel The Original of Laura. In the accompanying article, Herwig concluded that "Laura", although fragmentary, was "vintage Nabokov". He is the author of several books, among them a biography of Austrian poet Peter Handke and a study of the greatest Nazi cover-up in post-war Germany, "Die Flakhelfer", which will be published in English in 2014.

Herwig is also known as an interviewer, whose empathetic but also sometimes confrontational style with stars like Michael Douglas, Charlotte Rampling and Rupert Everett has won acclaim. Douglas once chided Herwig for his "cheeky questions", when the journalist asked him if he'd ever have homosexual experiences. Herwig also conducted interviews with heads of government like former German chancellor Helmut Schmidt and nobel laureates like German writer Günter Grass.

Herwig was the only journalist to get an interview with former SS-Captain Erich Priebke, which he conducted in Priebke's flat in Rome shortly before the latter's death on 11 October 2013. Referring to Hannah Arendt’s famous phrase about the Nazis when she covered the trial of Adolf Eichmann in Israel, the New York Times quoted Herwig as saying he wanted to use “the last chance to investigate that supposed banality of evil with a living person.”. Sensationally, the 100-year-old Priebke told Herwig he had renounced national socialism and deeply regretted his involvement in war crimes.

Bibliography 
 Die Flakhelfer. Wie aus Hitlers jüngsten Parteimitgliedern Deutschlands führende Demokraten wurden.  DVA, München 2013, 
 Meister der Dämmerung. Peter Handke: Eine Biographie, München: DVA, 2010, 
 Eliten in einer egalitären Welt, Berlin: wjs-Verlag, 2005, 
 Bildungsbürger auf Abwegen. Naturwissenschaft im Werk Thomas Manns, Frankfurt am Main: Klostermann, 2004,

References

External links 
 Official Blog
 In North Korea, Communism goes Cannes, New York Times, 21.11.2008 
 Still Life: The Jailhouse Jackson Pollock. After nearly two decades in solitary confinement, convicted murderer Donny Johnson has started painting, 2007
 Google's Total Library. Putting The World's Books On The Web, 2007
 Much Ado About Tom Cruise, 2007
 "They Take The Mind, and What Emerges is Just Tapioca Pudding". Interview with thriller writer Frederick Forsyth, 2006
 'Hitler? He was good in parts'. Malte Herwig interviews an unrepentant David Irving in his Viennese prison cell, 2006
 Sex for Sexagenarians. Movies Target Frisky Seniors

Living people
1972 births
German journalists
German male journalists
German critics
Alumni of the University of Oxford
Harvard University alumni
Johannes Gutenberg University Mainz alumni
Fellows of Merton College, Oxford
German male writers